Los Pelambres Airport is an airport serving the town of Salamanca and the Los Pelambres copper mine in the Coquimbo Region of Chile.

The mine and runway are in an adjoining valley running north from the river. There is mountainous terrain in all quadrants.

See also

Transport in Chile
List of airports in Chile

References

External links
OpenStreetMap - Los Pelambres Airport
OurAirports - Los Pelambres Airport
FallingRain - Los Pelambres Airport

Airports in Chile
Airports in Coquimbo Region